Automobiles Darracq France was a manufacturer of motor vehicles and aero engines in Suresnes, near Paris. The enterprise, known at first as A Darracq et Cie, was founded in 1896 by successful businessman Alexandre Darracq.

In 1902 he sold his new business to a privately held English company named A Darracq and Company Limited, taking a substantial shareholding and a directorship himself. He continued to run the business from Paris but was obliged to retire to the Côte d'Azur in 1913 following years of difficulties that brought his business into very hazardous financial circumstances. He had introduced an unproven unorthodox engine in 1911 which proved a complete failure yet he neglected Suresnes' popular conventional products. France then entered the first World War.

in 1916 ownership of the Suresnes business was transferred to Darracq S.A.  In 1922 Darracq's name was dropped from its products and this business was renamed Talbot S.A. Initially its products were branded Darracq-Talbot and then just Talbot. The London parent company suffered a financial collapse during the great depression and in 1935 Talbot S.A. was acquired by investors led by managing director, Antonio Lago.

History of the business

A Darracq et Cie
Alexandre Darracq, using part of the substantial profit he had made from selling his Gladiator bicycle factory to Adolpe Clément, formed a société en commanditie in February 1897 and named it A Darracq et Cie.  He built a new plant, the Perfecta works, in the Paris suburb of Suresnes just south of Puteaux.

Production began in January 1898 with bicycle parts, tricycles and quadricycles and a Millet motorcycle powered by a five-cylinder rotary engine and shortly after an electric brougham. In 1898 Darracq et Cie made a Léon Bollée-designed voiturette tricar. The somewhat old-fashioned voiturette proved a débâcle: the steering was problematic, the five-speed belt drive "a masterpiece of bad design", and the hot tube ignition crude, proving the 250,000 francs or £10,000 Darracq et Cie had paid for the rights a mistake.

A. Darracq et Cie was sold as of 30 September 1902 to A. Darracq and Company Limited, an English company a substantial part owned by Alexandre Darracq but majority controlled by a small group of English investors. J S Smith-Winby was appointed chairman. Further capital was raised and large sums were spent on factory expansion, the Suresnes site was expanded to some four acres in extent, and in England extensive premises were bought.

Opel Darracq
In 1902, A. Darracq et Cie signed a contract with Adam Opel to jointly produce vehicles in the German Empire under licence, with the brand name "Opel Darracq".

Darracq holder of six world speed records
A. Darracq et Cie prospered. By 1903, four models were offered: a 1.1-litre single, a 1.3 L and 1.9 L twin, and a 3.8 L four. The 1904 models abandoned flitch-plated wood chassis for pressed steel, and the new Flying Fifteen, powered by a 3-litre four, had its chassis made from a single sheet of steel. This car was Alexandre Darracq's chef d'oeuvre. There was nothing outstanding in its design but "every part was in such perfect balance and harmony" it became an outstanding model. Its exceptional quality helped the company capture a ten percent share of the French auto market.

In late 1904 the chairman reported sales were up by 20 per cent though increased costs meant the profit had risen more slowly. But what was more important was they had many more orders than they could fill and the only solution was to enlarge the factory by as much as 50 per cent. Twelve months later, the chairman was able to tell shareholders all the six speed records of the automobile world were held by Darracq cars and they had all been held more than twelve months and yet another had recently been added by K Lee Guinness.

Italy and Spain

Alexandre Darracq established Società Italiana Automobili Darracq (SIAD) in Portello, a suburb of Milan in Italy in 1906 through a license arrangement with Cavaliere Ugo Stella, an aristocrat from Milan. The business did not do well and Darracq shut it down in 1910. A new partnership, Anonima Lombarda Fabbrica Automobili (ALFA), acquired the business. In 1914 Nicola Romeo bought ALFA and it became Alfa Romeo. In 1907, Darracq formed Sociedad Anonima Espanola de Automoviles Darracq in Vitoria, Spain with a capitalization of 1,000,000 pesetas.

Cabs
An order was accepted from a M. Charley for several thousand cabs to sell to franchised operators in major European and American cities. Darracq ordered 4,000 chassis frames and built a new factory beside the existing one but except in New York the cabs were not as popular as the Renault and Unic competition. In 1907 one-third of  New York's 1,800 cabs were Darracqs. It was useful business during the recession of 1908 but Darracq turned his attention to heavy motor vehicles.

Steam buses

A joint venture into steam buses designed by Leon Serpollet was not a success. Only twenty were sold, and Darracq and Co lost money on the project. London's Darracq-Serpollet Omnibus Company incorporated in May 1906 was hampered by delays in building a new factory then by the death by cancer of 48-year old Serpollet in early 1907. The nurse of either Mr Nickols or Mr Karslake believed the steam buses would blow up and would not allow any of her charges to travel on one. The unpopular buses proved to have a brief uneconomic service life and their manufacturer was liquidated in 1912. Darracq and Co had to write off an investment of £156,000, a substantial portion of their capital.

Aviation
In 1907 Alexandre Darracq became interested in aviation and by 1909  Darracq S.A. were building light aero engines, used by Louis Blériot and Alberto Santos-Dumont. They were clearly based on their racing engines. There may have been just the two built.

Competition

After 1907 it became harder to sell Darracq's cars, prices had to be cut, new models did not attract the expected custom. Returning to Alexandre Darracq's 1898 idea to build low-cost, good-quality cars, much as Henry Ford was doing with the Model T, Darracq S.A. introduced a £260  model at the very end of 1911.<ref name=TT39768>Company Meetings, The New Darracq Valveless Model. The Times, Thursday, Dec 14, 1911; pg. 18; Issue 39768</ref> These, at the founder's insistence, would all be cursed with the Henriod rotary valve engine, which was underpowered and prone to seizing. The new engine's failure was reported by Darracq & Company London to its shareholders to be no more than the difficulty of achieving quantity production. It proved disastrous to the marque, and Alexandre Darracq would be obliged to resign.

In late 1911 Alexandre Darracq was replaced by new manager, his former chief engineer, Paul Ribeyrolles former head of Gladiator inventor and motor racing enthusiast. In June 1912 Darracq resigned, he had already sold all his shares. A main board director, Hopkins, was sent to Paris to take charge of general administration and former Rover Company chief engineer, Owen Clegg, was retrieved from USA where he was studying production methods at Darracq's expense and appointed works manager. At the end of 1912 the chairman reassured shareholders a return on their investment in the valveless motor would arrive in 1913. 

By February 1913 shareholders had set up their own inquiry into the unsatisfactory position of their business and it reported poor co-operation between London and Suresnes, they had been pulling against each other, furthermore there had been considerable loss through "recent changes in personnel". The committee then went on record saying: "M. Darracq, as a typical Frenchman, probably possessed far more originality and initiative than any Englishman of corresponding situation, but, if he displayed a failing, it was that he, like most of his brilliant race, lacked the Englishman's pertinacity, and, after a time, seemed to lose interest, as it were, in his original conceptions without making any serious effort to strike out a fresh line."The chairman of the investigating committee, Norman Craig, was appointed chairman of A Darracq and Company (1905).

New works manager Owen Clegg, appointed in October 1912, designer of the proven Rover Twelve, sensibly copied the Twelve for Darracq & Co's new model. Before his appointment as works manager Clegg had spent 12 months in USA at Darracq's expense studying automobile production. The factory at Suresnes was retooled for mass production, making it one of the first in the industry to do so. The 16HP Clegg-Darracq was joined by an equally reliable 2.1-litre 12HP car, and soon the factory was turning out sixty cars a week; by 1914, 12,000 men rolled out fourteen cars a day.

First World War
During the First World War, Darracq S.A. switched to the production of various war materials.

During 1916 these Suresnes assets were transferred to Société Anonyme Darracq, a new company incorporated in France for the purpose, British assets were transferred to a company named Darracq Motor Engineering Company Limited. A. Darracq and Company (1905) Limited was now no more than a holder of shares in these two businesses.

After the War automobile production resumed as soon as the Suresnes factory had ceased making munitions, arms and planes.   By the time of the Motor Show in October 1919 the prewar 16HP "Type V14" had returned to production, featuring a four-cylinder 2,940cc engine.    But the manufacturer's big news at the Paris show was the 24HP "Type A", powered by a V8 4,584cc unit.   This model had also been initiated by Managing Director Owen Clegg back in 1913, but production had been delayed by intervening events until 1919.   The "Type A" featured four forward speeds and, from 1920, four-wheel brakes. Despite these innovative features, it did not sell well.

The French franc had suffered a sustained crisis of its own during the war years, and in May 1920 the "Type V" was listed at 35,000 francs in bare chassis form:  a torpedo bodied car was priced at 40,000 francs.   Even the "Type V", with its  wheelbase, was substantial car, but for customers wanting more, a "Type A" appeared on the same list at 39,500 francs in bare chassis form, and 44,500 francs for a torpedo bodied car.

After the war the prewar 16HP V14 was the manufacturer's top-selling car in Britain.

Automobiles Talbot

Following the inclusion of Clément-Talbot in the S T D Motors group Suresnes products were branded Talbot-Darracq though the word Darracq was dropped in 1922 and this company was renamed Automobiles Talbot S.A.

Cars made by Automobiles Talbot  imported from France to England were renamed Darracq to avoid confusion with the English Clément-Talbot products.

Motor sport

Like other automobile makers in this era, such as Napier, Bentley, and Daimler, Darracq & Co participated in motor racing, and their drastically stripped-down voitures legére garnered publicity. A 1904 effort to win the Gordon Bennett Trophy, however, was disastrous: despite entries of identical 11.3 L cars built in Germany, France, and Britain (per the Trophy rules), Darracq & Co scored no success. A 1905 racer was more promising. On return to Europe the car was sold to Algernon Lee Guinness who set many records over the next few years until the car was retired in 1909 with a broken piston. This V8 Special (see full story at ) was rebuilt in 2005 using its original engine which had survived mostly intact. A video of the running engine was published on YouTube.

Darracqs won the 1905 and 1906 Vanderbilt Cup at Long Island, New York, both credited to Louis Wagner in a  12.7 L racer. Darracq & Co also won the Cuban race at Havana. Darracq & Co's final racing victory was the 1906 Vanderbilt Cup. Competition efforts did not stop entirely, however. In 1908, Darracqs came second, third, and seventh at the "Four Inch" Isle of Man Tourist Trophy, and in 1912, Malcolm Campbell entered a former works Darracq at Brooklands. After the Great War and as part of the STD combine Sunbeam Grand Prix re-badged as Talbot-Darracq participated in the 1921 French Grand Prix. The 'Invincible Talbot-Darracq' which were in effect a smaller versions of the Grand Prix cars dominated voiturette racing at the highest levels for six years, winning every race they entered.

Genevieve

In 1953, a British film directed by Henry Cornelius, Genevieve, featured a 1904 Darracq as its centrepiece. The film sparked an increase in collecting and restoring vintage automobiles.

In the 100th episode of Wheeler Dealers, Mike Brewer and Edd China restore a 1903 Darracq, borrowed from the Haynes International Motor Museum, to working order and drove it in the veteran car run from London to Brighton. This project was inspired by the movie.

References

Notes

Other sources
Northey, Tom, "Land-speed  record: The Fastest Men on Earth", in Northey, Tom, ed. World of Automobiles (London: Orbis, 1974), Volume 10, pp. 1161–1166. London: Orbis, 1974.
Setright, L.J.K. "Opel: Simple Engineering and Commercial Courage", in Northey, Tom, ed. World of Automobiles, Volume 14, pp. 1583–1592. London: Orbis, 1974.
Wise, David Burgess."Darracq: A Motor Enthusiast who Hated Driving", in Northey, Tom, ed. World of Automobiles, Volume 5, pp. 493–494. London: Orbis, 1974.
Wise, David Burgess."Vanderbilt Cup: The American Marathon", in Northey, Tom, ed. World of Automobiles'', Volume 21, pp. 2458–60-4. London: Orbis, 1974.

External links

 YouTube videos
The Darracq site of the British Sunbeam-Talbot-Darracq register
The Darracq V-8 world record car history and restoration

Defunct motor vehicle manufacturers of France
S T D Motors
Manufacturing companies based in Paris
Vehicle manufacturing companies established in 1896
Vehicle manufacturing companies disestablished in 1959
French companies established in 1896
1959 disestablishments in France
Suresnes